Çaylı (known as Fioletovka until 2005) is a village and municipality in the Bilasuvar Rayon of Azerbaijan.  It has a population of 1,968.

References 

Populated places in Bilasuvar District